Ctenophila salaziensis is a species of small air-breathing land snails, terrestrial pulmonate gastropod mollusks in the family Euconulidae, the hive snails. This species is endemic to Réunion, a French island in the Indian Ocean.

References

Molluscs of Réunion
Endemic fauna of Réunion
Ctenophila
Taxonomy articles created by Polbot